1 Trianguli is a solitary star located in the northern constellation Triangulum. With an apparent magnitude of 7.52, it is too faint to be seen with the naked eye but can be seen easily with binoculars.

1 Trianguli is an ordinary A-type main-sequence star with 2.4 the mass of the Sun and 2.7 times the radius of the Sun.

References 

Triangulum (constellation)
A-type main-sequence stars
Trianguli, 1
10407
7948